Liw or LIW can mean:

Geography
 Liw, Poland, a village in Masovia
 Gmina Liw, an administrative district named after that village
 Liw, an alternative name for the Liwiec river

People
 Daniel Liw, a Swedish bandy player

LIW
 Levantine Intermediate Water, an oceanographic feature of the Mediterranean Sea
 Low-intensity warfare, alternate term for low-intensity conflict, small-scale military action
 LIW, IATA code for Loikaw Airport in Burma
 , former name of Denel Land Systems, a South African arms manufacturer
 Long instruction word, in computer science, see Very long instruction word

See also
 Liu (surname)